is a stony asteroid and eccentric Mars-crosser, approximately 4 kilometers in diameter. It was discovered on 8 October 1997, by Japanese astronomers Tetsuo Kagawa and Takeshi Urata at Gekko Observatory near Shizuoka, Japan.

Orbit and classification 

The stony S-type asteroid orbits the Sun at a distance of 1.5–2.8 AU once every 3 years and 2 months (1,169 days). Its orbit has an eccentricity of 0.29 and an inclination of 3° with respect to the ecliptic. The first used observation was made at the Cerro El Roble Station in 1974, extending the asteroid's observation arc by 23 prior to its discovery.

Physical characteristics

Lightcurves 

Between 2006 and 2013, three rotational lightcurves for this asteroid were obtained from photometric observations made at the  Hunters Hill Observatory, Australia, the Ondřejov Observatory, Czech Republic, and the U.S. Palomar Transient Factory, California. They gave a well-defined, concurring rotation period of  hours (best result) with a brightness amplitude of 0.42, 0.40 and 0.27 in magnitude, respectively.

Diameter and albedo 

According to the survey carried out by the Japanese Akari satellite, the asteroid's surface has an albedo of 0.13 and a diameter of 4.75 kilometers. The Collaborative Asteroid Lightcurve Link assumes a standard albedo for stony asteroids of 0.20 and calculates a diameter of 3.1 kilometers, as the higher the body's albedo (reflectivity), the shorter its diameter, at a constant absolute magnitude (brightness).

Numbering and naming 

This minor planet was numbered by the Minor Planet Center on 2 February 1999. As of 2018, it has not been named.

Notes

References

External links 
 Pravec − Results from Asteroid Photometry Project at Ondřejov Observatory
 Asteroid Lightcurve Database (LCDB), query form (info )
 Dictionary of Minor Planet Names, Google books
 Asteroids and comets rotation curves, CdR – Observatoire de Genève, Raoul Behrend
 Discovery Circumstances: Numbered Minor Planets (5001)-(10000) – Minor Planet Center
 
 

Mars-crossing asteroids
1997 TG19
1997 TG19
19971008